Godfrey Awaire Thoma (born 22 January 1957) is a Nauruan politician and police officer.

Member of Parliament

Thoma started his first term in the parliament after being elected in 1995, ousting Theodore Moses after only three years. He had been subsequently re-elected to parliament until 2007, when he lost his seat to newcomer Dantes Tsitsi.

Second term

Following the parliament's dissolution in 2008 after President Marcus Stephen had declared a state of emergency, Thoma was re-elected to parliament to serve a second term for the Aiwo Constituency, ending the 31-year parliamentary term of former president René Harris who died just two months later.

He retained his seat in the 2010 parliamentary election.

Thoma was defeated in the 2013 election.

Minister of Justice and Speaker of the Parliament of Nauru

Thoma served as Minister of Justice in the administrations of René Harris and Ludwig Scotty.

In May 2003 he was elected Speaker of Parliament, but resigned just one day later. Following the 2010 parliamentary election, he was again elected Speaker. Elected on 13 May, he resigned on 18 May, to prevent President Marcus Stephen from forming a government.
Thoma was elected as speaker for a third time on 25 April 2013 after the previous speaker, Ludwig Scotty resigned after a period of parliamentary deadlock and tension between the government and the opposition.

See also

 Politics of Nauru
 Elections in Nauru
 2008 Nauruan parliamentary election
 Parliament of Nauru#Current MPs
 List of speakers of the Parliament of Nauru

Sources
 https://web.archive.org/web/20130926022811/http://islandsbusiness.com/2013/5/pacific-update/nauru-elections-in-possible-delay/

References

Speakers of the Parliament of Nauru
1957 births
Living people
People from Aiwo District
Government ministers of Nauru
21st-century Nauruan politicians